Long Selatong is a Kenyah longhouse in the Marudi division of Sarawak, Malaysia.

The village was the subject of research into subsistence farming between 1976 and 1980 by Chin See Chung of the Department of Botany, University of Malaya. He spent long periods with the people and learned the Kenyah language. He concluded that "in principle, the Kenyah swidden system and resources utilization patterns and strategies are stable, adaptive and compatible with the functioning of the rainforest ecosystem".

If the Baram Dam hydroelectric project goes ahead, Long Selatong will be one of the villages affected by the flooding of 389,000 hectares of jungle.

Neighbouring settlements include:

References

Villages in Sarawak